Lina's sunbird (Aethopyga linaraborae) is a species of bird in the family Nectariniidae   It is endemic to mountains in the island of Mindanao in the Philippines. It is one of the most striking sunbirds in the country with the males having iridescent blue color and orange spot on its yellow breast. It is named after Dioscoro S. Rabor's wife, Lina.  Its natural habitat is r tropical moist montane forest above 1000 m. It is threatened by habitat loss

Description 

EBird describes the bird as "A small, localized bird of montane forest in eastern Mindanao. Has a long, curved bill, an olive back, an orange mark in the middle of the chest and a bluish tail with white tips. Male has an iridescent blue crown, cheek, and wing, a green shoulder and rump, yellow underparts, and a small orange patch in front of the shoulder. Female has faint streaking on the underparts, a gray head, and golden-olive wings. Similar to Metallic-winged sunbird, but male has a blue wing and female a gray head. Voice includes a high-pitched jumbled song, a series of sharp “chik!” notes, and an upslurred high-pitched whistle."

Breeding has been observed in May but this is not yet fully understood.

Habitat and Conservation Status 
It occupies montane mossy forest from 970 to 2,000 m and above. 

IUCN has assessed this bird as near threatened. Despite its limited range, it is said to be locally common in its range. As it occurs in rugged and inaccessible mountains, this has allowed a large portion of its habitat to remain intact. However, there it is still affected by habitat loss through deforestation, mining,  land conversion and slash-and-burn - just not to the same extent as lowland forest.  Mt. Tagubud in New Bataan, where it is mainly seen by birdwatchers, has faced considerable deforestation.

References

Lina's sunbird
Birds of Mindanao
Lina's sunbird
Lina's sunbird
Taxonomy articles created by Polbot